Symmocoides ferreirae is a moth of the family Autostichidae. It is found in Spain. Its type locality is Piedrabuena, Ciudad Real.

References

Moths described in 2000
Symmocoides
Moths of Europe